Kyle Brotzman (born October 3, 1986) is a former arena football placekicker. He has also been a member of the Utah Blaze, Jacksonville Sharks and Spokane Empire.

College career
He played for the Boise State Broncos. A former walk-on, he became the Broncos' starting kicker and punter.

He garnered second-team All-WAC honors in 2007 and was Boise State's co-Special Teams Player of the Year in 2008. In the 2010 Fiesta Bowl, Brotzman threw a fourth-down pass out of punt formation that led to the Broncos' winning touchdown.

Brotzman gained national media attention when he missed two late-game field goals in the November 26, 2010 game versus the Nevada Wolf Pack. The first one, a 26-yarder at the end of regulation, would have sealed a victory for the Broncos as time ran out. The second failed attempt would have put the Broncos ahead in overtime, and was a 29-yard try. Nevada went on to win the game 34–31, dealing Boise State its first defeat of the 2010 season. Boise State coach Chris Petersen refused to directly blame the loss on Brotzman, stating that "one play can win a game but one play can't lose it. There's a lot of plays to be made that we didn't make for whatever reason." Meanwhile, Nevada's coach, Chris Ault characterized his win as the greatest in the program's history. After the game, over 45,000 Broncos fans showed their support for Brotzman on Facebook. However, he was also the recipient of death threats and hate-mail from angered Boise State fans.  He graduated with the record for the most points in NCAA history by a Division I kicker.*

Professional career
On June 15, 2011, he signed with the Utah Blaze of the Arena Football League. He debuted in Utah Blaze's 81-40 victory over the Pittsburgh Power.

On November 12, 2015, Brotzman was assigned to the Jacksonville Sharks. On March 10, 2016, Brotzman was placed on reassignment.

Brotzman was signed by the Spokane Empire on April 7, 2016. He was released on April 12, 2016. On March 10, 2017, Brotzman once again signed with the Empire. He was released on March 15, 2017.

On April 4, 2019, the Idaho Horsemen announced that Brotzman had signed with the team.

References

External links 
 Boise State Bio
 Utah Blaze Bio

Boise State Broncos football players
Living people
American football placekickers
Utah Blaze players
1986 births
People from Meridian, Idaho
Players of American football from Idaho
Jacksonville Sharks players
Spokane Empire players